The Hildreth–Flanagan–Heierman House is a historic home in the Hyde Park historic district in Austin, Texas. It is also a part of the Shadow Lawn Historic District, a subdivision of the Hyde Park neighborhood designated by Hyde Park founder Monroe M. Shipe.

The home was completed in 1902 by master builder William Voss Sr. for owner Charles A. Hildreth, at a total cost of $2,718. The house combines features of the Queen Anne and Colonial Revival styles.

The house is located at 3909 Avenue G. It was added to the National Register of Historic Places in 1990.

Houses on the National Register of Historic Places in Texas
Houses in Austin, Texas
National Register of Historic Places in Austin, Texas
City of Austin Historic Landmarks